The Manassas Sandstone is a Carnian Stage sandstone geological formation in Virginia, United States.

The Carnian Stage is part of the Triassic System of the Mesozoic.

Fossil theropod tracks have been reported from the formation.

See also 
 List of dinosaur-bearing rock formations
 List of stratigraphic units with theropod tracks

References

Bibliography 
  

Triassic System of North America
Carnian Stage
Triassic geology of Virginia
Sandstone formations of the United States
Fluvial deposits
Ichnofossiliferous formations